Bürkelkopf is a mountain of the Samnaun Alps, located on the border between Austria and Switzerland. It lies between Ischgl (Tyrol) and Samnaun (Graubünden). In winter it is part of a ski area.

References

External links
 Bürkelkopf on Hikr

Mountains of the Alps
Mountains of Graubünden
Mountains of Tyrol (state)
Alpine three-thousanders
Austria–Switzerland border
International mountains of Europe
Mountains of Switzerland
Samnaun